The Swedish International Stroke Play Championship or Swedish International (SI) was a women's golf tournament played in Sweden from 1962 to 2007. It featured on the Swedish Golf Tour starting from the tour's inception in 1986.

Named Svenskt Internationellt Slagtävlingsmästerskap (SISM) until it formally assumed the name Swedish International in 1984, the tournament was amateur only from 1962 to 1983, turning open to any golfer from 1984 with the introduction of the men's Swedish Golf Tour. Officially a Swedish National Championship starting in 1982, a separate National Champion was named in the event of a foreign winner. The tournament was discontinued after the 2007 season.

Winners

Amateur tournament

Sources:

See also
Swedish International – Men's tournament

References

External links
Coverage on the Swedish Golf Federation's official site: All winners

Swedish Golf Tour (women) events
Golf tournaments in Sweden
Recurring sporting events established in 1962
Recurring sporting events disestablished in 2007